Willerval is a commune in the Pas-de-Calais department in the Hauts-de-France region of France.

Geography

Population

The inhabitants are called Willervalois.

Places of interest
 The church of St. Nicholas, rebuilt, as was most of the village after the First World War.
 The Commonwealth War Graves Commission cemetery.

See also
 Communes of the Pas-de-Calais department

References

External links

 Beehive CWGC cemetery at Willerval

Communes of Pas-de-Calais